Out of the Blue is album by American banjoist Alison Brown, released in 1998.

Reception 

In his Allmusic review, music critic Charlotte Dylan wrote of the album; "The music on this album is bluegrass flavored with a little jazz. Fans won't notice anything untried or bold here from Alison Brown, but there are a number of good songs on this album..."

Writing for No Depression magazine, Rachel Leibrock felt the album was restrained and called it "a cocktail-hour fusion of jazz, Latin and Caribbean rhythms.. a sparkling and crisp arrangement of unassuming instrumentals, but they never fully hook the listener... Dispassionate and cool, the record is too pristine and orderly to burn itself into a more emotional listening sphere."

Track listing 
All compositions by Alison Brown unless otherwise noted
 "Out of the Blue" – 5:45
 "Dantes' Paradise" – 3:35
 "Coast Walk" – 3:58
 "Four for Launch" – 3:11
 "Road to Corossol" (Brown, Burr, West) – 4:46
 "Mood Ring" (Brown, West) – 5:11
 "Samba del Sol" – 3:39
 "Sands of Sound" – 3:59
 "Return to Pelican bay" – 3:44
 "Rebel's Bolero" – 2:56

Personnel
 Alison Brown – banjo, guitar
 John Burr – piano, keyboards
 Rick Reed – drums
 Garry West – bass

References

1998 albums
Alison Brown albums
Compass Records albums